The Nadgee River is a mature intermittently closed saline coastal lagoon; or perennial river located in the South Coast region of New South Wales, Australia.

Course and features
The river flows generally east, joined by two minor tributaries before reaching its mouth with the Tasman Sea of the South Pacific Ocean, west northwest of Black Head, north of Cape Howe. The river descends  over its  course.

See also

 Rivers of New South Wales
 List of rivers of New South Wales (L–Z)
 List of rivers of Australia

References

External links
 

 

Rivers of New South Wales
South Coast (New South Wales)
Coastline of New South Wales